Jacob Darwin Hamblin (born September 17, 1974) is an American professor of history, specializing in international aspects of science, technology, and the global environment. His 2013 book Arming Mother Nature: The Birth of Catastrophic Environmentalism won two prestigious awards: the 2014 Paul Birdsall Prize and the 2016 Watson Davis and Helen Miles Davis Prize.

Education and career
Hamblin received in 1995 a diploma in history from the University of Kent in Canterbury, England. At the University of California, Santa Barbara, he graduated in history with a B.A. in 1995, an M.A. in 1998, and a Ph.D. in 2001. His Ph.D. thesis
Oceanography and International Cooperation during the Early Cold War was supervised by Lawrence Badash. From 2001 to 2002 Hamblin was a postdoctoral fellow in Paris at the Centre Alexandre Koyré, École des Hautes Études en Sciences Sociales. He was a lecturer from 2002 to 2004 at Loyola Marymount University in Los Angeles and also from 2002 to 2006 at California State University in Long Beach. From 2006 to 2009 he was an assistant professor of history at Clemson University in South Carolina. In the history department of Oregon State University (OSU), Hamblin was from 2009 to 2012 an assistant professor and from 2012 to 2015 an associate professor and is, since 2015, a full professor. At OSU he is also, since 2014, the director of Environmental Arts and Humanities Initiative.

Hamblin's essays have been published in many academic journal, as well in The New York Times and Salon.com. From 2017 to 2022 he was the principal investigator for the OSU Downwinders Project. As of 2022, he is the author of five books. His 2021 book The Wretched Atom: America's Global Gamble with Peaceful Nuclear Technology won the 2021 Oregon Book Award for general nonfiction. He was from 2009 to 2011 an advisory editor for the journal Isis, from 2013 to 2018 a member of the advisory board of Environmental History), and was from 2016 to 2019 a founding editorial board member of Modern American History published by Cambridge University Press. He is since 2011 an advisory editor for Historical Studies in the Natural Sciences, since 2020 a subject editor for the Journal of the History of Biology, and since 2020 an editorial board member for the Oregon State University Press.

Selected publications

Articles
  2002
  2006
  2007
  2009
  2014

Books

References

External links
 
 
 
  (reading by Hamblin from 13:12 to 22:23 in video)

1974 births
Living people
20th-century American historians
21st-century American historians
American historians of science
University of California, Santa Barbara alumni
Oregon State University faculty
American male non-fiction writers